KMON-FM (94.5 MHz) is a radio station broadcasting a country music format. Licensed to Great Falls, Montana, United States, the station serves the Great Falls area. The station is currently owned by Townsquare Media and features programming from Premiere Networks and Westwood One.

History
The station went on the air as KNUW-FM on 1979-11-30. On 1984-11-02, the station changed its call sign to the current KMON.

KMON-HD2
On May 5, 2017, KMON-FM launched an adult alternative format on its HD2 subchannel, branded as "107.5 The Peak" (simulcast on translator K298BL 107.5 FM Great Falls).

References

External links

MON-FM
Radio stations established in 1979
1979 establishments in Montana
Townsquare Media radio stations